East Timor was a de facto province of Indonesia that existed between 1976 and 1999 during the Indonesian occupation of East Timor. Its territory corresponded to the previous Portuguese Timor and to the present-day independent country of Timor-Leste.

From 1702 to 1975, East Timor was an overseas territory of Portugal, called "Portuguese Timor". In 1974, Portugal initiated a gradual decolonisation process of its remaining overseas territories, including Portuguese Timor. During the process, a civil conflict between the different Timorese parties erupted. In 1975, Indonesia invaded East Timor and in 1976, it formally annexed the territory, declaring it as its 27th province and renaming it "Timor Timur". The United Nations, however, did not recognise the annexation, continuing to consider Portugal as the legitimate administering power of East Timor. Following the end of Indonesian occupation in 1999, as well as a United Nations administered transition period, East Timor became formally independent of Portugal in 2002 and adopted the official name of Timor-Leste.

Background 

From 1702 to 1975, East Timor was an overseas territory of Portugal, lately being officially the Portuguese overseas province of Timor, usually referred as "Portuguese Timor". Following the "Carnation Revolution" of 1974, the new Government of Portugal initiated a gradual decolonization process of its overseas territories, including Portuguese Timor. During the process, a civil conflict between the several Timorese political parties erupted, with the left-wing Revolutionary Front for an Independent East Timor (Fretilin) prevailing and being able to control the capital Dili, obliging the Portuguese governor and his staff to move his seat to the Atauro Island.

On the 28 November 1975, Fretilin unilaterally declared the independence of the then Portuguese Timor, calling it República Democrática de Timor-Leste (Portuguese for "Democratic Republic of East Timor"). Portugal did not however recognize that independence, with the Portuguese governor continuing to be present and formally administering the province from Atauro, although having a limited de facto authority over the remaining territory of East Timor.

Nine days later, Indonesia began the invasion of the majority of the territory of East Timor. Following the invasion, the Portuguese governor and his staff left Atauro aboard two Portuguese warships. As a statement of Portuguese sovereignty, Portugal maintained those warships patrolling the waters around East Timor until May 1976.

On 17 July 1976, Indonesia formally annexed East Timor as its 27th province and changed its official name to Timor Timur, the Indonesian translation of "East Timor". The use of the Portuguese language was then forbidden, as it was seen as a relic of colonisation.

The annexation was recognized by a few countries, the most relevant being the United States and Australia, but was not recognized by Portugal, the majority of other countries and the United Nations. The United Nations continued to recognise Portugal as the legitimate administering power of East Timor.

The Indonesians left in 1999 and East Timor came under the administration of the United Nations.

After the re-establishment of the independence of Timor-Leste in 2002, the East Timorese government requested that the name Timor-Leste be used in place of "East Timor". This is to avoid the Indonesian term and its reminder of the Indonesian occupation.

Government
As with all provinces of Indonesia, executive authority was vested in a Governor (Gubernur) and Vice-Governor (Wakil Gubernur) elected by the Regional People's Representative Council (Dewan Perwakilan Rakyat Daerah, DPRD) every five years. Legislative authority was vested in the DPRD, both in province and regency level.

Governors 

List of Governors of East Timor Province (Indonesian: Gubernur Provinsi Timor Timur) from 1976 to 1999:

Regional People's Representative Council
Composition of the Regional People's Representative Council between 1980 and 1999:

Administrative divisions 

The province was divided into thirteen regencies (kabupaten) and one administrative city (kota administratif). These are listed below along with their districts (kecamatan), per December 1981:

Dili Administrative City, served as the capital of East Timor, also the capital and part of Dili Regency, consisted of East Dili (Dili Timur) and West Dili (Dili Barat) districts, which formerly belonged to Dili Regency before the creation of the administrative city status in November 1981.
Dili Regency, consisted of Dili Administrative City, Atauro and Metinaro districts.
Baucau Regency, with its capital at Baucau, consisted of Baucau, Vemasse, Laga, Baguia, Venilale, and Quelicai districts.
Manatuto Regency, with its capital at Manatuto, consisted of Manatuto, Laclubar, Barique, Laclo, and Laleia districts.
Lautem Regency, with its capital at Lospalos, consisted of Lospalos, Luro, Iliomar, Lautem, and Tutuala districts.
Viqueque Regency, with its capital at Viqueque, consisted of Viqueque, Ossu, Uato-Lari, Lacluta, and Uato-Carbau districts.
Ainaro Regency, with its capital at Ainaro, consisted of Ainaro, Maubisse, Hatu-Bullico, Hato-Hudo, and Mape districts.
Manufahi Regency, with its capital at Same, consisted of Same, Alas, Fato-Berliu, and Turiscai districts.
Kova-Lima Regency, with its capital at Suai, consisted of Suai, Tilomar, Fohorem, Fatu-Lulic, and Fatu-Mean districts.
Ambeno Regency, with its capital at Pante-Makassar, consisted of Pante-Makassar, Oe-Silo, Nitibe, and Passabe districts.
Bobonaro Regency, with its capital at Maliana, consisted of Maliana, Bobonaro, Lolotoi, Atabai, Balibo, and Cailaco districts.
Liquica Regency, with its capital at Liquica, consisted of Liquica, Bazar-Tete, and Maubara districts.
Ermera Regency, with its capital at Gleno, consisted of Ermera, Atsabe, Hatolia, Lete-Foho, and Railaco districts.
Aileu Regency, with its capital at Aileu, consisted of Aileu, Remexio, Laulara, and Lequidoe districts.

Gallery

See also 
 Indonesian occupation of East Timor
 1999 East Timorese crisis
 East Timor–Indonesia relations

References

External links 
 Report of CAVR — Chega! 
 ETAN.org: East Timor Action Network
 ETAN.org:  Articles and reports − 1991 to 1996

Indonesian occupation of East Timor
Former provinces of Indonesia
History of East Timor
1970s in East Timor
1980s in East Timor
1990s in East Timor
States and territories established in 1976
States and territories disestablished in 1999
1976 establishments in Indonesia
1999 disestablishments in Indonesia
1970s establishments in East Timor
1990s disestablishments in East Timor
1976 establishments in Southeast Asia
1999 disestablishments in Southeast Asia
History of Timor